Alphonce Omija (born 2002) is a Kenyan professional footballer who plays for Kariobangi Sharks and the Kenya national team U20 as a defender.

Personal life 
Omija  studied at St John's Catholic School and later joined Baba Dogo Secondary School. He has stated that he looks up to defender Kalidou Koulibaly as a role model.

Honours

Club 

 Gor Mahia

 Kenyan Premier League: 2019

References

External links 

 Alphonce Omija Under 20 National Team Call Up at Citizen TV Kenya
 Alphonce Omija at Gor Mahia Official Website
 Alphonce Omija Signing at Kisure Sports
Alphonce Omija Under 20 National Team Call Up at Football Kenya Federation

2002 births
Living people
Footballers from Nairobi
Kenyan footballers
Gor Mahia F.C. players
Kenyan Premier League players
Kenya international footballers
Association football midfielders
Association football defenders